John Ashe, Sr. (ca. 1720 – October 24, 1781) was Speaker of the House of Burgesses in the Province of North Carolina.  He was Harvard educated and fought in the North Carolina militia during the French and Indian War.  During the American Revolution, he attained the rank of major general and was in charge of North Carolina militia and state troops from 1776 to 1779.  He resigned from military service after the Patriot defeat at the Battle of Brier Creek in 1779.

Early life
John Ashe was born at Grovely, New Hanover County, North Carolina (now Brunswick County, North Carolina) on March 24, 1725. His parents were Elizabeth Swann and John Baptista Ashe.  His father, born in England and settled in the Cape Fear region of the Province of North Carolina, was a member of the Governor's Council and died in 1734.  John Ashe was a member of Harvard University class of 1746 but did not graduate.  He settled on the northeast Cape Fear River, where he built a plantation called Green Hill.

Ashe served as a colonel in the Province of North Carolina militia during the French and Indian War (17541763). In 1752, he was elected to the North Carolina House of Burgesses and served as Speaker of the House of Burgesses from 1762 to 1765 (his father, John Baptista Ashe, had served as speaker in 1726–27).  He was known for his eloquence and strong will.

An outspoken opponent of the Stamp Act and eventually a supporter of independence from Great Britain, Ashe served in the North Carolina Provincial Congress and on both the committees of correspondence and safety as hostilities between the colonies and Great Britain began to rise.

Revolutionary War
As a result of his opposition to the Stamp Act, he resigned his royal commission as a colonel in the militia and was elected colonel in the patriot militia by the people of New Hanover County in 1775. In January 1776, he was commissioned as the commandant with a rank of colonel over the Volunteer Independent Rangers.  Leading a force of 500 men, Ashe destroyed the British garrison of Fort Johnston (near present-day Wilmington, North Carolina) in 1775.   Raising and equipping this unit at his own expense, Ashe led his regiment in the American victory at the Battle of Moore's Creek Bridge on February 27, 1776.  The unit was disbanded after this battle.

On May 4, 1776, he was commissioned as brigadier general of the Wilmington District Brigade of the North Carolina militia.  Under his leadership, he constructed defenses for an anticipated British assault on the Cape Fear region.  However, the British bypassed Cape Fear and went to Charleston, instead.
  
On November 8, 1778, he was commissioned as North Carolina's first major general and placed in command of all North Carolina's militia by Governor Richard Casswell.

Brier Creek

He was dispatched to support Continental Army Major General Benjamin Lincoln following the British capture of Savannah, Georgia in late 1778.  Ashe's troops first marched to Purrysburg, South Carolina, where Lincoln had established his camp, but was then sent north to join forces threatening Augusta, Georgia, which was being held by British Lieutenant Colonel Archibald Campbell.  Ashe's advance in early February 1779 prompted Campbell to abandon Augusta, and Ashe followed him southward in Georgia.  Ashe halted just above Briar Creek, where the British had burned out a bridge during their retreat, and established a camp while he traveled back to South Carolina for a war council with Lincoln.  Ashe returned to the Brier Creek camp on March 2.

Lieutenant Colonel Campbell had, however, been active.  In a plan that was well executed by Colonel Mark Prevost, most of the British force embarked on a lengthy detour to flank Ashe's camp while a diversionary force demonstrated on the far side of the burned-out bridge.  The British approached his camp from the rear on March 3, with Ashe's force having just 15 minutes notice to prepare for the onslaught.  Ashe's poorly trained and supplied militia were routed, with an estimated 150 casualties compared to around 16 British casualties.  Ashe was subjected to a court martial, which found that although he was not entirely to blame for the debacle, he was guilty of setting inadequate guards around his camp.

Service Record:
Colonel over the New Hannover County Regiment, North Carolina militia (early 1775)
Colonel over the Volunteer Independent Rangers (1776)
Brigadier General of the Wilmington District Brigade of North Carolina militia (1776-1778)
Major General over all North Carolina militia and state troops (1778-1779)
After he resigned his commission, William Smallwood of Maryland was selected to command the North Carolina militia in 1780 and 1781.

Capture and death
Returning to Wilmington, he remained active there in suppressing Loyalist activity in the district. He was captured and held as a prisoner of war following the town's occupation in 1781 by the army of General Charles Cornwallis, 1st Marquess Cornwallis.

Contracting smallpox while imprisoned, Ashe was paroled, but died in Sampson County on October 24 shortly after his release.

Family
He married Rebecca Moore, sister of Judge Maurice Moore and General James Moore. They had four sons:  William, Samuel, John, and A'Court (none of whom left children) and three daughters: Harriet, Eliza (whose husband, William H. Hill, was U.S. district attorney), and Mary (who married an Alston and whose son, Joseph, was governor of South Carolina and husband of Theodosia, the daughter of Aaron Burr).

One of his sons, John Ashe Jr., served as a captain in the 4th North Carolina Regiment. Governor Samuel Ashe, for whom Asheville, North Carolina was named, was his younger brother, and other descendants (not named Ashe since none of their male children had offspring) have continued to play a role in North Carolina politics, including Margaret Ashe Pruette, arrested as part of Moral Monday during the 2013 North Carolina legislative protests.

References

 
 
 

1720 births
1781 deaths
Harvard University alumni
American Revolutionary War deaths
Deaths from smallpox
Ashe family
North Carolina militiamen in the American Revolution
Militia generals in the American Revolution
State treasurers of North Carolina
American Revolutionary War prisoners of war held by Great Britain
Infectious disease deaths in North Carolina
People from Brunswick County, North Carolina
People of colonial North Carolina
Members of the North Carolina Provincial Congresses